Tooley is a surname that may refer to:

 Bert Tooley (1886–1976), American professional baseball player
 James Tooley (contemporary), British professor of education policy at Newcastle University
 John Tooley (1924–2020), English musical administrator
 John Tooley (weightlifter) (born 1897), British Olympic weightlifter
 Léon Tooley (b. 1972), British novelist
 Mark Tooley (b. 1965), American conservative magazine editor and think-tank president
 Michael Tooley, American philosopher
 Nicholas Tooley (1583–1623), English Renaissance actor
 Richard Tooley (1820–1910), Canadian farmer and provincial assembly legislator from Ontario
 S.D. Tooley (contemporary), American novelist of mystery and urban fantasy

It may also refer to:
 Tooley Street, London street in the Borough of Southwark
 1861 Tooley Street fire, a fire on Tooley Street

See also
 Toley, fictional character played by Ron Hayes in the television western Two Faces West 1961 episode "Music Box" 
 Albert Toley (1855-1924), founder and first president of Brent Valley Golf Club in Hanwell, London, UK
 George Toley (1916-2008), American collegiate coach